The Crafts Street City Stable is a historic redbrick public works building located at 90 Crafts Street near Ashmont Avenue in Newton, Massachusetts. Designed for $375 by Boston-based architect and Newton resident William F. Goodwin in the Colonial Revival style of architecture, it was built in 1895 for the city of Newton at a cost of $25,000 to serve  as additional stable for its then Highway Department. Over the years, it was converted to a city garage and is now called the Crafts Street Garage. It forms the focal point for the city's Department of Public Works complex. On December 18, 2009, the building along with a 20-foot perimeter strip around it was added to the National Register of Historic Places.

See also
 City Stable and Garage
 National Register of Historic Places listings in Newton, Massachusetts

References

National Register of Historic Places in Newton, Massachusetts
Colonial Revival architecture in Massachusetts
Buildings and structures in Newton, Massachusetts
Government buildings completed in 1895